Eternal Rituals for the Accretion of Light is the third full-length studio album from American art rock band Junius. The record was released in CD, limited edition Vinyl, and digital download format through Prosthetic Records on March 3, 2017.

Background 
After the departures of long time guitarist Michael Repasch-Nieves and bassist Joel Munguia Reynolds, Joseph E. Martinez wrote and recorded the album in 15 months with founding member Dana Filloon on drums. Additional vocals and lyrics on "A Mass for Metaphysicians" and "Clean the Beast" by Drew Speziale (of Circle Takes the Square). Joel Munguia Reynolds has since returned to the band as their touring bass player.

Theme 
Junius' 2011 LP Reports from the Threshold of Death explored the soul's journey after death and with Eternal Rituals for the Accretion of Light the soul reincarnates and tries to break free of Samsara. The album's 10 tracks serve as a guide for the Initiate to reach transcendence. It also completes their trilogy of albums starting with The Martyrdom of a Catastrophist, Reports from the Threshold of Death and ending with Eternal Rituals for the Accretion of Light.

Reception 
Eternal Rituals of the Accretion Light received generally positive reviews from critics. Revolver Magazine lists "Clean the Beast" as one of their top 50 songs of 2017. Received Album of the year from Rock and Roll Fables. No. 8 album in 2017 from Vancouver Weekly. It was No. 3 on Excretakano of Metal Sucks top albums of 2017. Album of the Year from Godless and No. 3 from Chuck of The Metal Podcast.

Track listing

Personnel 
Eternal Rituals for the Accretion of Light  album personnel adapted from the CD liner notes

Junius
 Joseph E. Martinez – vocals, lyrics, guitar, bass, synths
 Dana Filloon – drums, Auxiliary percussion
 Drew Speziale – additional vocals & lyrics on "A Mass for Metaphysicians" and "Clean the Beast"

Production
 Junius & Will Benoit  – production
 Will Benoit – mixing & mastering 
 Daryl Rabidoux – engineering
 Recorded at Radar Studios in Clinton, CT
Art
 Drew Speziale (of Circle Takes the Square) – Album artwork, design, and layout

References

External links 
 

2011 albums
Art rock albums by American artists
Concept albums
Space rock albums
Prosthetic Records albums
Junius (band) albums